The Butterfly Girl is a 1921 American silent drama film directed by John Gorman and starring Marjorie Daw, Fritzi Brunette, and King Baggot.

Cast
 Marjorie Daw as Edith Folsom 
 Fritzi Brunette as Lorna Lear 
 King Baggot as H.H. Van Horn 
 Jean De Briac as John Blaine 
 Ned Whitney Warren as Ned Lorimer 
 Lisle Darnell as Mary Van Horn

References

Bibliography
 Donald W. McCaffrey and Christopher P. Jacobs. Guide to the Silent Years of American Cinema. Greenwood Publishing, 1999.

External links

1921 films
1921 drama films
Silent American drama films
Films directed by John Gorman
American silent feature films
1920s English-language films
Pathé Exchange films
American black-and-white films
1920s American films